Mimophobetron is a monotypic moth genus of the family Crambidae described by Eugene G. Munroe in 1950. It contains only one species, Mimophobetron pyropsalis, described by George Hampson in 1904, which is found in Central America (Panama, Costa Rica, Mexico, Honduras), the Bahamas and Florida.

References

Spilomelinae
Taxa named by Eugene G. Munroe
Crambidae genera
Monotypic moth genera